Telchius is a genus of spiders in the family Oonopidae. It was first described in 1893 by Simon. , it contains 3 African species.

References

Oonopidae
Araneomorphae genera
Spiders of Africa